The north-eastern orange-tailed slider (Lerista zonulata) is a species of skink found in Queensland in Australia.

References

Lerista
Reptiles described in 1991
Taxa named by Glen Milton Storr